Gregorio Cruz (died 1577) was a Roman Catholic prelate who served as Bishop of Martirano (1569–1577).

Cruz was ordained a priest in the Order of Preachers. On 1 Apr 1569, he was appointed during the papacy of Pope Pius V as Bishop of Martirano. On 16 Apr 1569, he was consecrated bishop by Scipione Rebiba, Cardinal-Priest of Sant'Angelo in Pescheria, with Giulio Antonio Santorio, Archbishop of Santa Severina, and Thomas Goldwell, Bishop of Saint Asaph, serving as co-consecrators. He served as Bishop of Martirano until his death in 1577.

References

External links and additional sources
 (for Chronology of Bishops) 
 (for Chronology of Bishops)  

16th-century Italian Roman Catholic bishops
Bishops appointed by Pope Pius V
1577 deaths
Dominican bishops